To be distinguished from Antonio Tarsia (Venice 1662–1739), an Italian sculptor.

Antonio Tarsia (July 28, 1643 – 1722) was an Italian composer.

Tarsia was born in Koper, Slovenia.  He was the major composer of the early Baroque in Ljubljana and left a large amount of Latin sacred compositions.  He died in Koper, Slovenia.

References

17th-century Italian composers
18th-century Italian composers
Italian Baroque composers
Italian male composers
1643 births
1722 deaths
People from Pula
17th-century male musicians